Bozpar (also known as Būzpar, Poshtpā, and Pusht-i-Pa) is a village in Eram Rural District, Eram District, Dashtestan County, Bushehr Province, Iran. At the 2006 census, its population was 1,267, in 224 families.

References 

Populated places in Dashtestan County